The West African potto (Perodicticus potto) is a species of nocturnal strepsirrhine primate. It is found in tropical West Africa. It is also known as Bosman's potto, after Willem Bosman, who described the species in 1704. It is the type species of the genus Perodicticus.

Taxonomy 
This species was formerly considered the only species in the genus Perodicticus, but a 2015 study split it into three species, with only the name Perodicticus potto only applying to the West African population.

Phylogenetic evidence supports the West African potto being the most basal member of the genus Perodicticus, with the other two species being sister species to one another. It is thought to have diverged from the other species during the mid-late Miocene, between 6-10 million years ago.

The mysterious "false potto" (Pseudopotto martini) is now thought to have been a misidentified specimen of West African potto.

Distribution 
This species ranges from Guinea west to Nigeria, with an disjunct population in eastern Senegal. The Niger River serves as the eastern barrier to the species' range, separating it from the Central African potto (P. edwardsi).

Ecology 
One population of chimpanzees living in Mont Assirik, Senegal, was observed to eat West African pottos, taking them from their sleeping places during the day; however, this behaviour has not been observed in chimps elsewhere.

Conservation 
Although this species is known to survive in disturbed forests near human habitation, population growth and subsequent habitat destruction in West Africa are of major risk to the species. Heavy deforestation for industrial agriculture is thought to have led to rapid population declines in the species. In addition, this species is more frequently hunted for bushmeat due to a decline in larger animals to hunt, which has in turn also caused pottos to become rarer. Due to this, it is classified as Near Threatened on the IUCN Red List.

References 

Lorises and galagos
Mammals of West Africa
Primates of Africa
Mammals described in 1766
Taxa named by Philipp Ludwig Statius Müller